José Luis Rodríguez Zapatero (born 1960) is a former Prime Minister of Spain.

Zapatero may also refer to:
Zapatero (surname)
Zapatero District, Peru
Jorge Abrego or El Zapatero
"Zapatero", a track by Manolo García from Arena en los Bolsillos
"El Zapatero", a song by Luis Vargas

See also
Zapatera (disambiguation)